This is a list of the largest fires of the 21st century.

References

21st-century fires